Singarathope (சிங்காரத்தோப்பு) is a neighbourhood  in the city of Tiruchirappalli in Tamil Nadu, India. It lies between Devathanam and Tharanallur. There is a showroom of handloom chain Poompuhar located here.

References 
 List of Travel agencies in Tiruchirappalli

Neighbourhoods and suburbs of Tiruchirappalli